Barrister Venkanna H. Nayak
  

(1879–1929) from Gonehalli village, into a Nadavaru family. was a Commissioner of Bijapur District, India, and a Deputy Commissioner of Dharwar District. He instigated several new plans to help sects of Bijapur district who were economically and socially backward. Perhaps, he was the first Bar-at-Law from Uttar Kannada district. On a special case, he was appointed as District Collector of Bijapur district though he was not a ICS.  

Venkanna was born to Devamma Venkanna Nayak (Gange keri) from Hanehalli.  His father Husbu Murkundi Nayak was a farmer and a Patel (Village administrator) of Gonehalli village. Venkanna was raised in a village that was, during heavy monsoon, a sleepy village with lush green fields, coconut trees, puddles and ponds.  Venkanna  attended schools from the neighboring villages Torke and Bankikodla to complete his primary education. Venkanna was headmaster of Kannada a primary school in Torke village. He went to Karwar to pursue his high school diploma (S. S. C.) from the Government High School, Karwar.

In 1906, V. H. Nayak completed B.Sc. (Biology) from Elphinstone College, Mumbai. In 1906, Naik went to London to pursue higher education. In 1908 and 1910, he earned B.A. and M.A. from St John's College, Cambridge.

After returning from London, Nayak was appointed as a deputy director of Konkan Agricultural Science Department and then as a special assistant registrar of Bombay Revenue Department. In 1918, he visited London to earn Barrister of Lincoln's Inn. With an internship opportunity, Nayak visited government offices in London, and other European nations.  After returning to India in 1921, Nayak was appointed as a deputy commissioner of Dharwar district and then, in 1925, he was promoted to commissioner of Bijapur district, Karnataka. V. H. Nayak instigated several new plans and projects to help sects of Bijapur district who were economically and socially backward. In Bijpur district, a large population belonged to the scheduled castes and to the scheduled tribes.

Nayak died at the young age of 50 in Bijapur. In remembrance, after his death, people of Bijpur district built his statue in downtown of Bijapur city. B. V. Nayak the son of V. H. Nayak and Parwati (his 3rd wife) was a Member of Parliament Fifth Loka Sabha in New Delhi, India. Devaraya Nayak, the oldest son of V. H. Nayak from his first wife, died in World War II. V. H. Nayak was the maternal grandfather of Dilip, a professor at Northwestern University.

References

External links
 V. H. Naik's visit to Europe

Kannada people
1879 births
1929 deaths
Alumni of St John's College, Cambridge
Alumni of the Inns of Court School of Law
Indian civil servants
People from Uttara Kannada
People from Bijapur district, Karnataka
Indian barristers
Lawyers in British India
